Little Women is a musical with a book by Allan Knee, lyrics by Mindi Dickstein, and music by Jason Howland.

Based on Louisa May Alcott's 1868–69 semi-autobiographical two-volume novel, it focuses on the four March sisters— traditional Meg, wild, aspiring writer Jo, timid Beth and romantic Amy,— and their beloved Marmee, at home in Concord, Massachusetts, while their father is away serving as a Union Army chaplain during the Civil War. Intercut with the vignettes in which their lives unfold are several recreations of the melodramatic short stories Jo writes in her attic studio.

Productions
A workshop production was presented at Duke University in February 2001, directed by Nick Corley. This production followed a workshop reading in March–April 2000. The production next played another workshop at Duke University in October 2004. This version was directed by Susan H. Schulman.

After 55 previews, the Broadway production opened at the Virginia Theatre on January 23, 2005, and closed on May 22, 2005, after 137 performances. It was directed by Susan H. Schulman, with choreography by Michael Lichtefeld, set design by Derek McLane, costume design by Catherine Zuber, and lighting design by Kenneth Posner.

The Broadway cast featured Sutton Foster as Jo, Maureen McGovern as Marmee/The Hag, Janet Carroll as Aunt March/Mrs. Kirk, Jenny Powers as Meg/Clarissa, Megan McGinnis as Beth/Rodrigo II, Amy McAlexander as Amy/The Troll, Danny Gurwin as Laurie/Rodrigo, Robert Stattel as Mr. Laurence/ The Knight, Jim Weitzer as Mr. Brooke/ Braxton, and John Hickok as Professor Bhaer.

A 30-city US tour, with McGovern as Marmee, Kate Fisher as Jo, Renee Brna as Meg, Autumn Hurlbert as Beth, and Gwen Hollander as Amy ran from August 2005 (San Diego, California) through July 2006 (Kennedy Center, Washington, DC).

Kookaburra produced the Australian premiere production, which ran at the Seymour Centre, Sydney, from November 2008 through December 2008. Opera Australia's Stuart Maunder directed, with musical direction by Peter Rutherford. The cast included Kate-Maree Hoolihan as Jo, Trisha Noble as Marmee, Judi Connelli as Aunt March, Erica Lovell as Amy, Octavia Barron-Martin as Meg, Jodie Harris as Beth, Hayden Tee as Professor Bhaer, Stephen Mahy as Laurie, David Harris as John, and Philip Hinton as Mr. Lawrence.

The show was first seen in Europe in an Austrian production billed as European premiere by Theater im Neukloster, Vienna, in 2007 using the German title "Beth und ihre Schwestern" ("Beth and her sisters"). It was brought to the Hope Mill Theatre in Manchester in 2017 lead by Amie Giselle-Ward in the role of Jo March. Bronagh Lagan directed with musical direction from Rickey Long in a production also billed as the European premiere.

In July 2018, the show made its East Anglian debut (Great Britain) at Sheringham Little Theatre in North Norfolk.

The musical made its London premiere at the Park Theatre from November through December 2021.

Plot
Act I
In 1866, Josephine March (Jo) receives a notice of rejection from another publisher, making it her twenty-second rejection. Jo asks Professor Bhaer, another boarder at Mrs. Kirk's Boarding House, his opinion on her story ("An Operatic Tragedy"). The professor is not entranced by her blood and guts saga. He tells her that he thinks that she can write something better. Jo, taken aback and angry at Bhaer's reaction, asks him what he knows to criticize her and insults him by calling him old. He reacts by saying that he has stated his opinion as she has hers. He leaves. Jo, left alone, wonders what could be "better" than the story she has written. But then she muses that perhaps her writing was better when she was at home in Concord, Massachusetts ("Better").

Three years earlier at her attic-studio, Jo assembles her sisters, Meg, Beth and Amy, to tell them that she will be putting up for a show of her own called the "Operatic Tragedy". The sisters beg Jo to not put it up for a show but Jo convinces them that this play will be a hit and will make for the best Christmas there ever was. ("Our Finest Dreams"). Marmee, their mother, comes in with a letter from Mr. March who is away as a Union Army chaplain in the American Civil War. As she writes a response, she reflects on how hard it is to be the pillar of strength in the March home ("Here Alone").

Aunt March, the wealthy aunt of the March sisters, asks Jo to change from being a tomboy to a model lady of society. She tells Jo of an idle thought to bring her along to Europe. Jo begs to go with her, but Aunt March reasons that she will take her only if she changes. Jo, who has always dreamed of seeing Europe, agrees ("Could You?"). Meanwhile, Meg has one of her own dreams realized: she and Jo are invited to Annie Moffat's Valentine's Day Ball. But on the day of the ball, while the two sisters are rushing around for their finishing touches, Meg announces that she cannot go. She asks Marmee what to say when one of her potential suitors asks her to dance. Marmee tells Meg to just smile and say "I'd be delighted" ("Delighted"). Amy, who cares about society and fine things more than Jo, rushes down in Jo's old ball gown to join them in going to the ball, but Jo stops her, as she is not invited.

At the ball, Jo accidentally sits on Laurie, who is a neighbor of the Marches' along with his grumpy grandfather, Mr. Laurence. She apologizes to Laurie and asks him why he is sitting down. Laurie replies that he must have passed out from too much dancing. Laurie's tutor, Mr. John Brooke, then comes in and scolds Laurie for not meeting important people, which would make Mr. Laurence furious. Mr. Brooke asks Meg to dance and Meg agrees. Meg and Mr. Brooke are smitten at first sight. Laurie confesses to Jo his need for friends and asks Jo to dance with him. Jo replies that she doesn't dance and has a patch on her dress but Laurie keeps on trying to make an impression ("Take A Chance On Me").

Back at the March's after the ball, Jo and Amy have a little confrontation after it is revealed that a spiteful Amy had burned Jo's story manuscript in the fireplace, but Marmee sends Amy off to her bed and tells Jo that Amy is just a child. Jo spits back that Amy is a not a child but a demon in a child's body. Jo then rushes up to her attic to rewrite her story. Laurie invites Jo to a skating match, which she at first refuses but eventually agrees to. Amy wants to go with them but she already outgrown her pair of skates. Beth, who intends to stay home, offers Amy her old skates.

Beth is sitting at the family's old piano when Mr. Laurence comes in looking for Laurie, who is out with Jo and Amy. Mr. Laurence discovers Beth's talent at the piano and they sing a duet ("Off to Massachusetts"). Jo and Laurie come in from the skating race with Amy in Laurie's arms because she had fallen into the ice while skating. Jo and Amy reconcile, and Jo makes Laurie an honorary member of the March family ("Five Forever"). Mr. Brooke excuses Meg for a while to tell her of his enlistment in the Union Army. He then asks Meg her hand in marriage, and she accepts ("More Than I Am").

But Jo's life goes to crisis when Mr. March's sickness calls Marmee. Jo has a confrontation with Aunt March after she cuts her hair and sells it to raise money for Marmee’s trip to Washington. Aunt March then turns her focus to Amy, molding her to be the society lady that she envisioned for Jo.
Laurie, who decides to ask Jo to marry him, then comes in her attic-studio. Laurie tries to kiss her but Jo gently pushes him away. He put out a ring but Jo thinks that it is a joke. Laurie says he loves Jo. Jo does not accept his marriage proposal. He tells her that she will marry, but Jo tells him that she will never marry; Laurie, on the contrary, says she will, but not to him ("Take A Chance On Me (Reprise)"). Jo then ponders her future, which is changing significantly. She vows to find another way to achieve her future ("Astonishing!").

Act II
At Mrs. Kirk's boarding house at New York City, she is holding a telegram for Jo from Mrs. March. Jo bounces in, looking for the professor. She then realizes that the professor is right in front of her. She tells them her fantastic news: she made her first sale as an author ("The Weekly Volcano Press")!  She tells them the story of the sale as well, that thanks to Professor Bhaer's advice, she re-edited the story. But the news is disturbed when Jo reads the telegram. She is notified of Beth's scarlet fever and immediately packs her bags to return to Concord.

Jo, after a few days, sends a letter to Professor Bhaer, asking him what's new in New York. The professor struggles to write a decent response ("How I Am"). Back in Concord, at a nearby seashore, Beth says good bye to Jo, telling her that she is not afraid to move on because she is loved by everyone, especially Jo, and that she is grateful to have them with her during her lifetime ("Some Things Are Meant To Be"). Beth dies soon after. Amy and Laurie come home from Europe and struggle to tell Jo of their pending marriage because they do not wish for Jo to be upset ("The Most Amazing Thing").

Jo and the family grieve Beth's death. Marmee, being the strong one, tells Jo of how she copes with Beth's death: she tells Jo that she cannot be defeated by Beth's death, and that she must move on ("Days of Plenty"). Jo reminisces while her sisters are still with her. She finds that her family and friends are themselves astonishing and this encourages her to write her novel, Little Women ("The Fire Within Me").

On the day of Laurie and Amy's wedding, Professor Bhaer comes to Concord to see Jo. Jo is very surprised to see him because she "never thought he would do it." He then proceeds to tell Jo of his feelings for her saying "Though we are not at all alike, you make me feel alive." ("Small Umbrella In The Rain"). He then proposes and Jo accepts his proposal. The professor tells Jo that he sent the manuscript of her novel Little Women to the Weekly Volcano Press, the same publisher that accepted Jo's operatic tragedy. He tells Jo that the publisher agreed to publish it, and Jo proclaims her happiness ("Sometimes When You Dream (Reprise)").

Characters

Doubling of roles

The show was written to be performed by a cast of ten who played 18 individual roles.

Women:
1 – Jo
2 – Meg, Clarissa
3 – Marmee, Hag
4 – Amy, Troll
5 – Beth, Rodrigo II
6 – Aunt March, Mrs. Kirk

Men:
1 – Professor Bhaer
2 – Laurie, Rodrigo
3 – Mr. John Brooke, Sir Braxton Prendergast
4 – Mr. Laurence, The Knight

In the Operatic Tragedy

Optional Chorus

The script and score include notations for the addition of a chorus to include:

Dancers at the ball
Ice-skaters
Chorus of Hags
Chorus of Trolls
Chorus of Monks
Beachcombers

Song list

Act I
 Overture
 An Operatic Tragedy- Jo, Clarissa, Braxton, Rodrigo
 Better- Jo
 Our Finest Dreams- Jo, Beth, Amy, and Meg
 Here Alone- Marmee
 Could You?- Aunt March and Jo
 Delighted- Marmee, Meg, Beth, and Jo
 Take a Chance on Me- Laurie
 Better (Reprise)- Jo
 Off to Massachusetts- Beth and Mr. Laurence
 Five Forever- Jo, Beth, Meg, Amy, and Laurie
 More Than I Am- Mr. Brooke and Meg
 Take A Chance on Me (Reprise)- Laurie
 Astonishing- Jo

Act II
 The Weekly Volcano Press- Jo, Professor Bhaer, Mrs. Kirk, Clarissa, Braxton, Rodrigo, Hag, Troll, Knight, Rodrigo II, optional chorus of Hags, Trolls and Monks
 Off To Massachusetts (Reprise)- Mr. Laurence, Beth, Jo, Marmee, Meg, Mr. Brooke
 How I Am- Professor Bhaer
 Some Things Are Meant to Be- Beth and Jo
 The Most Amazing Thing- Amy and Laurie
 Days of Plenty- Marmee
 The Fire Within Me- Jo
 Small Umbrella in the Rain- Jo and Professor Bhaer
 Sometimes When You Dream (Reprise) – Jo

Note: Better (Reprise), Take A Chance on Me (Reprise), and Off To Massachusetts (Reprise) are excluded from the cast recording.

Cast and characters

Reception
Reception for the musical was mixed to positive, with praise being aimed at Foster's performance and the musical's score, and criticism for the book and overall pacing of the production.

Ben Brantley, reviewing for The New York Times, wrote "Watching this shorthand account of four sisters growing up poor but honest during the Civil War is like speed reading Alcott's evergreen novel of 1868. You glean the most salient traits of the principal characters, events and moral lessons, but without the shading and detail that made these elements feel true to life in the book...Since the characters do not acquire full personalities, you don't feel emotionally invested in them." He wrote of Sutton Foster: "The slim and supple Ms. Foster has a lot to carry on those twitchy shoulders. If 'Little Women' does develop the following of young girls and their mothers the producers have targeted, it will be largely Ms. Foster's doing."

The Village Voice reviewer noted "The show itself, similarly, seems lost in the drafty hugeness of the Virginia, where the often charming family scenes are dwarfed by the high proscenium arch (emphasized by the metal scaffolding that frames Derek McLane's otherwise attractive settings). The pity of it is that, between seizures, so much of Little Women's reality has been established. Allan Knee's script offers long passages of astutely condensed Alcott; Jason Howland's pleasant music, inventively orchestrated by Kim Scharnberg, pulls contemporary shapes out of period waltzes, polkas, and quadrilles, bumpily but gamely supported by Mindi Dickstein's uneven lyrics. And the cast, as always, offers many potential rescuers."

Awards and nominations

Original Broadway production

References

External links

Little Women listing production and plot, Guide to Musical Theatre
Little Women, Music Theatre International website

2005 musicals
Broadway musicals
Musicals based on novels
Plays set in Massachusetts
Plays set in the 19th century
Works based on Little Women